Amanita polypyramis is a species of Amanita found in Eastern United States from New Jersey, to Costa Rica in Central America.

References

External links

polypyramis
Fungi of North America